HMAS Tamworth (J181/B250/A124), named for the city of Tamworth, New South Wales, was one of 60 s constructed during World War II and one of 20 built on Admiralty order but manned by personnel of and later commissioned into the Royal Australian Navy (RAN). Tamworth later saw service in the Royal Netherlands Navy (RNLN) and in the Indonesian Navy (TNI-AL).

Design and construction

In 1938, the Australian Commonwealth Naval Board (ACNB) identified the need for a general purpose 'local defence vessel' capable of both anti-submarine and mine-warfare duties, while easy to construct and operate. Construction of the prototype  did not go ahead, but the plans were retained. The need for locally built 'all-rounder' vessels at the start of World War II saw the "Australian Minesweepers" (designated as such to hide their anti-submarine capability, but popularly referred to as "corvettes") approved in September 1939, with 60 constructed during the course of the war: 36 ordered by the RAN, 20 (including Tamworth) ordered by the British Admiralty but manned and commissioned as RAN vessels, and 4 for the Royal Indian Navy.

Tamworth was laid down by Walkers Limited at Maryborough, Queensland on 25 August 1941. She was launched on 14 March 1942 by Mrs. A. M. Horsburgh, the wife of one of the shipyard's directors, and commissioned on 8 August 1942.

Operational history
From February 1943 until January 1945, Tamworth was assigned to the British Eastern Fleet. Following this, she was deployed with the British Pacific Fleet. Tamworth returned to Australian operational control on 28 September 1945. Tamworth earned two battle honours for her wartime service, "Pacific 1942–45" and "Indian Ocean 1943–44".

After a brief period of service as a training vessel in Australian waters was transferred to the Royal Netherlands Navy on 30 April 1946. In RNLN service, the ship operated under the name HNLMS Tidore, and served until December 1949.

Following this, the ship was transferred to the Indonesian Navy, renamed RI Pati Unus, and served until disposal in 1969.

Citations

References

Books

Journal and news articles

External links

Bathurst-class corvettes of the Royal Australian Navy
Ships built in Queensland
1942 ships
World War II corvettes of Australia
Bathurst-class corvettes of the Indonesian Navy
Corvettes of the Cold War